A Local Community Team, or LoCo Team, is a group of local Linux advocates. The main focus of a LoCo team is to advocate the use of the Linux operating system as well as the use of open source/free software products.

Ubuntu & LoCos
The Ubuntu OS receives the credit for the promotion of the use of LoCos. They provide an assortment of materials and media to help each LoCo with their goals.

Approved LoCo Teams

New LoCo Teams
Cyprus

See also
 Linux User Group
 Ubuntu Community Council
 Jono Bacon -- Ubuntu Community Manager

External links
 Ubuntu LoCo List
 Ubuntu LoCo Main
 Ubuntu LoCo Howto
 Ubuntu LoCo FAQ
 Ubuntu LoCo List (Wiki)
 Ubuntu tries to go LoCo in all 50 states

Linux user groups

ru:Группа пользователей Linux#LoCo